The 10 was a Greek TV series that was aired in 2007-08 season by Alpha TV. The screenplay was based in the novel "The 10" written by M. Karagatsis and was directed by Pigi Dimitrakopoulou. The adapted screenplay was written by Stavros Kalafatidis, Mary Zafeiropoulou and Giorgos Kritikos. The series star Dimitris Kataleifos, Reni Pittaki, Maria Nafpliotou, Alexandros Logothetis, Thaleia Matika, Vassilis Charalampopoulos and others. The series won 11 television awards in "Prosopa" Greek Television Awards.

Plot
The series follows the novel and presents as main characters the tenants of an old block of flats near Piraeus, during 1950s. The owner of the block is a rich man, named Kalogeras. His nephew is a tenant of the block and he hopes to be his heir. The series also focuses to a lot of other characters from the neighbourhood near the block of flats or other persons related with the main characters.

Cast
 Dimitris Kataleifos
 Reni Pittaki
 Maria Protopappa
 Sotiris Hatzakis
 Alexandros Logothetis
 Maria Nafpliotou
 Vassilis Charalampopoulos
 Thaleia Matika
 Elisavet Naslidou
 Marissa Triandafyllidou
 Errikos Litsis
 Dimitris Imellos

Awards
The series won 11 television awards in "Prosopa" Greek Television Awards:

See also
 The 10 (novel)

References

External links

Greek drama television series
Alpha TV original programming
2007 Greek television series debuts
2008 Greek television series endings
2000s Greek television series
Television shows filmed in Greece